Racinoa spiralis is a moth in the family Bombycidae. It was described by Lars Kühne in 2008. It is found in Kenya and Rwanda.

References

Bombycidae
Moths described in 2008